Tibet Museum may refer to:

Tibet Museum (Dharamsala)
Tibet Museum (Lhasa)
Tibet Museum (South Korea)
Tibet Museum (Gruyères)